Fawn Sharp (born May 20, 1970) is a Native American politician, attorney, and policy advocate who is the current president of the National Congress of American Indians. Prior to serving in this capacity, Sharp served as president of the Quinault Indian Nation, as president of the Affiliated Tribes of Northwest Indians, and as vice president of the National Congress of American Indians.

Sharp has also served in a variety of non-tribal governmental capacities, including as an administrative law judge at the Washington Department of Revenue, a governor of the Washington State Bar Association, and as one of Governor Gary Locke's appointed trustees for Grays Harbor College. Following the Cobell v. Salazar decision, Sharp was appointed by the United States Department of the Interior to serve as chair of the National Commission on Indian Trust Administration and Reform.

Early life and education 
Sharp was born in Aberdeen, Washington. Sharp graduated from Gonzaga University in 1990 at age 19, and is a University of Washington School of Law 1995 alumna. Following law school, Sharp has since received certificates from the University of Oxford and the University of Nevada.

Career 

Opponents attempted to recall several Quinault officials in November 2015, resulting in the removal of the nation's vice president, but Sharp kept her position. She was elected to her fourth term as Quinault president in March 2015. The Quinault Nation hosted the Canoe Journey in 2013, during her third term.

Diplomatic representative
Sharp was the first person issued diplomatic credentials as a tribal leader by the United States Department of State, representing National Congress of American Indians at 2021 United Nations Climate Change Conference (COP26).

References

1971 births
20th-century American lawyers
20th-century Native Americans
21st-century American lawyers
21st-century American politicians
21st-century American women politicians
21st-century Native Americans
Living people
Native American lawyers
Native American leaders
Native American women in politics
Place of birth missing (living people)
Quinault people
University of Washington School of Law alumni
Washington (state) lawyers
20th-century American women
20th-century Native American women
21st-century Native American women